William Thorold may refer to:
William Thorold (engineer), English engineer and architect
William Thorold (died by 1594), MP for Grantham
Sir William Thorold, 1st Baronet, his son, English landowner and politician, MP for Grantham